The Mill may refer to:

The Mill (company), a post-production and visual effects company
The Mill (Burne-Jones painting), a painting by British artist Edward Burne-Jones
The Mill (Rembrandt), a painting by Dutch baroque artist Rembrandt
The Mill (Rembrandt print), 1641
The Mill, the fictional workplace in Doctors 
The Mill (TV series), a 2013 British period television drama#
The Mill (1921 film), Swedish film
Cranfield Mill, or The Mill, an apartment complex in Ipswich, England
The Mill (newspaper), a local online newspaper operating in Greater Manchester

See also
Mill (disambiguation)